The 1990 World Lacrosse Championship was the sixth World Lacrosse Championship and was played at the WACA Ground in Perth, Western Australia from July 7-15, 1990. The United States defeated Canada 19-15 in the final to win the tournament. The Iroquois Nationals became the fifth team to participate in the tournament.

Results

Standings

Third Place
Australia 16, England 6

Final
United States 19, Canada 15

References

1990
World Lacrosse Championship
1990 in Australian sport
1990s in Perth, Western Australia
Sports competitions in Perth, Western Australia
July 1990 sports events in Australia